The 2011 National League Championship Series (abbreviated NLCS) was a best-of-seven playoff pitting the winners of the 2011 National League Division Series, the St. Louis Cardinals and Milwaukee Brewers, against each other for the National League championship and the right to be the league's representative in the 2011 World Series. The series was the 42nd NLCS in league history.

The series began on October 9 to accommodate the World Series, which was scheduled to begin on October 19. TBS televised all games in the United States with Game 1 starting at 4:05pm EDT. Games 1, 2 and 6 were played at Miller Park in Milwaukee, Wisconsin, while the other games were played at Busch Stadium in St. Louis, Missouri. By coincidence, Brian Anderson, who usually called Brewers games on Fox Sports Wisconsin during the regular season, did the play-by-play for the NLCS on TBS, along with Ron Darling and John Smoltz. Anderson filled in for regular TBS lead baseball announcer Ernie Johnson, who was tending to a son in the hospital.

This was the Brewers' first-ever appearance in the NLCS, having moved to the National League in 1998. As an American League team, the Brewers made the ALCS in their pennant season of 1982, defeating the California Angels, 3–2. Thus, the Brewers became the first franchise to play in the LCS as a member of each league. The Cardinals, meanwhile, appeared in the NLCS for the first time since winning the 2006 World Series. This was a rematch of the 1982 World Series (a.k.a. the "Suds Series", with both cities associated with the brewing industry with Milwaukee's  Miller Brewing Company, Joseph Schlitz Brewing Company, and Pabst Brewing Company and St. Louis, whose Anheuser-Busch company is namesake of the Cardinals' ballpark), which the Cardinals won, 4–3.

The Cardinals would go on to defeat the Texas Rangers in seven games in the World Series.

This is mainly due to the restriction between two divisional opponents meeting in the Division Series being removed following this season.

Summary

Milwaukee Brewers vs. St. Louis Cardinals

Game summaries

Game 1
Sunday, October 9, 2011 – 4:05 pm (EDT) at Miller Park in Milwaukee, Wisconsin

Game 1 would be a back-and-forth affair. The Cardinals manufactured a run in the first with a walk by Jon Jay, a single by Albert Pujols, and a two-out single from Matt Holliday. The Brewers answered with a two-run home run from Ryan Braun after a walk in the bottom half. The Cardinals would go ahead in the fourth on a David Freese three-run home run and would add on a run with a Lance Berkman single in the fifth.  The Brewers came storming back in the fifth. The inning began with a Corey Hart single and a Jerry Hairston Jr. double. Braun then hit a ground-rule double, making the score 5–4.  Prince Fielder put the Brewers ahead with a two-run home run and after Octavio Dotel relieved starter Jaime García, Yuniesky Betancourt hit another two-run home run to make it 8–5 Brewers. A Pujols double-play grounder in the seventh off of Takashi Saito would make it 8–6 (the run charged to starter Zack Greinke), but the Brewers got the run back with a Jonathan Lucroy RBI single in the bottom half off of Kyle McClellan. Francisco Rodríguez would pitch a scoreless eighth inning and John Axford would get the save in the ninth as the Brewers took Game 1, 9–6.

Game 2
Monday, October 10, 2011 – 8:05 pm (EDT) at Miller Park in Milwaukee, Wisconsin

The Cardinals' offense erupted off of Shaun Marcum in Game 2, going up 2−0 in the first on Albert Pujols's two-run home run. His two-run double in the third made it 4−0 Cardinals. Next inning, Yadier Molina hit a leadoff double and scored on Nick Punto's single. In the bottom half, Prince Fielder hit a leadoff double off of Edwin Jackson before Rickie Weeks's home run put the Brewers on the board. In the fifth, Jon Jay hit a leadoff double off of Marco Estrada, then scored on Pujols's double. Pujols moved to third on a groundout, then scored on a wild pitch. The Brewers had a chance to put the game within one run in the fifth, but Weeks grounded into a double play with the bases loaded, killing the Brewers' rally. In the seventh, Pujols hit a ground-rule double with one out, then scored on Matt Holliday's single off of Kameron Loe. After Lance Berkman singled, RBI singles by Molina, David Freese, and Nick Punto made it 11–2 Cardinals. Prince Fielder hit a solo home run for the Brewers in the eighth off of Mitchell Boggs and Freese did the same for the Cardinals in the ninth off of Chris Narveson. The Cardinals won 12–3, tying the Series at a game apiece as well as potential momentum going back to St. Louis. Pujols hit a home run, three doubles, three runs scored, and five RBIs.

Game 3
Wednesday, October 12, 2011 – 8:05 pm (EDT) at Busch Stadium in St. Louis, Missouri

Rafael Furcal hit a leadoff single in the first inning off Yovani Gallardo, moved to second on a wild pitch and back-to-back RBI doubles by Jon Jay and Albert Pujols made it 2–0 Cardinals. Two walks loaded the bases before Yadier Molina's ground-ball double-play and David Freese's double scored a run each. Gallardo and three Milwaukee relievers held the Cardinals scoreless for the rest of the game. In the second, three consecutive leadoff singles off of Chris Carpenter put the Brewers on the board. After a fly ball moved Jerry Hairston Jr. to third, he scored on Gallardo's sacrifice fly. Next inning, Mark Kotsay's home run made it a one-run game, but Carpenter and four relievers held the Brewers scoreless for the rest of the game as the Cardinals' 4–3 win gave them a 2–1 series lead.

Game 4
Thursday, October 13, 2011 – 8:05 pm (EDT) at Busch Stadium in St. Louis, Missouri

Brewers starter Randy Wolf kept Milwaukee from falling into a 3–1 series deficit, throwing seven stellar innings, striking out six batters, but allowed home runs to Matt Holliday in the second and Allen Craig in the third to put the Cardinals up 2–0. The Brewers scored two runs to tie the game in the fourth inning, with Jerry Hairston hitting an RBI double to score Prince Fielder, who doubled to lead off, and Yuniesky Betancourt followed with a single to score Hairston. The Brewers went up 3–2 in the fifth on a single by Ryan Braun off of Mitchell Boggs with the run charged to starter Kyle Lohse, and added an insurance run in the sixth on a crucial error by Ryan Theriot on George Kottaras's ground ball. Though the Cardinals had the tying run at the plate in three of the last four innings, Wolf, along with relievers Francisco Rodríguez and John Axford, shut the Cardinals down to even the series at two games apiece, guaranteeing that the series would end in Milwaukee. It was also the Brewers' first playoff win on the road since Game 1 of the 1982 World Series.

Game 5
Friday, October 14, 2011 – 8:05 pm (EDT) at Busch Stadium in St. Louis, Missouri

The Cardinals took advantage of four Milwaukee errors to grab a 3–2 series lead. Yadier Molina's one-out RBI double with runners on first and second put them on the board in the second off of Zack Greinke. One out later, an error on Jaime Garcia's ground ball scored two more runs. Garcia's groundout with runners on second and third in the fourth made it 4−0 Cardinals. Corey Hart's RBI single in the fifth provided the only run of the game for the Brewers. The Cardinals added to their lead on Albert Pujols's RBI single in the sixth and Matt Holliday's two-run double in the eighth off of Marco Estrada. Octavio Dotel got the win in relief of García and Jason Motte earned another save with  shutout innings.

Game 6
Sunday, October 16, 2011 – 8:05 pm (EDT) at Miller Park in Milwaukee, Wisconsin

The Cardinals got off to a quick start, scoring four runs off Shaun Marcum in the first. Lance Berkman got things started with an RBI single. Eventual series MVP David Freese hit a three-run blast to extend their early lead. Marcum would last only this one inning. The Brewers got a run right back on a leadoff solo shot by Corey Hart in the bottom half of the inning off of Edwin Jackson, but the Redbirds would make it a four run game again as Rafael Furcal homered to make the score 5–1 in the second off of Chris Narveson. Milwaukee would start to claw their way back in their half of the inning, as Rickie Weeks hit a leadoff home run and Jonathan Lucroy hit a two-run home run to make the score 5–4. In the third, however, Albert Pujols led off with a solo shot of his own. They then loaded the bases on a single, double and intentional walk before Nick Punto's sacrifice fly scored a run and moved the runners up. LaTroy Hawkins relieved Narveson and allowed a two-run single to Allen Craig. In the bottom of the fourth, back-to-back doubles by Jerry Hairston Jr. and Yuniesky Betancourt off of Fernando Salas made it 9–5 Cardinals, but in the fifth, Kameron Loe allowed back-to-back leadoff singles to Matt Holliday and Freese before Yadier Molina's fielder's choice scored a run. After Punto struck out, Adron Chambers's sacrifice fly made it 11–5 Cardinals. Ryan Braun's groundout in the bottom half off of Marc Rzepczynski scored the last run for the Brewers while the Cardinals added a run in the eighth off of Francisco Rodríguez on Pujols's RBI single. In the ninth, with the score 12–6, Cardinals closer Jason Motte came on to pitch in a non-save situation. Motte struck Mark Kotsay out swinging to end the game and give St. Louis the National League Pennant.

Composite box
2011 NLCS (4–2): St. Louis Cardinals over Milwaukee Brewers

Aftermath

National League Championship Series MVP David Freese would continue his torrid hitting in the World Series. In what is considered one of the greatest games ever played, with the Texas Rangers leading the game 7–5, and leading the series by 3 games to 2, Freese came to bat in the bottom of the ninth with two out and two men on base. With a count of one ball and two strikes, Freese hit a two-run triple off closer Neftalí Feliz just out of the reach of Nelson Cruz's glove to tie the game and send it to extra innings. In the 11th inning, Freese hit a game-winning lead-off, walk-off homerun to deep center field to send the World Series to a Game 7. The Cardinals would win the next game, thus giving them their 11th World Series. For his heroics, Fresse became just the sixth player to win an LCS and World Series MVP in the same postseason.

On December 10, 2011, it was revealed by Outside the Lines that regular-season National League MVP Ryan Braun had tested positive for a performance-enhancing drug. His initial positive test, from October 2011, had been overturned after Braun, and his legal team, waged a successful battle against the drug collector, Dino Laurenzi Jr. Laurenzi had waited to deliver the specimens to the lab, instead of delivering them right away per his instructions. Braun and his lawyers painted Laurenzi as incompetent and even insinuated that he purposefully tampered with Braun's urine sample because he was a Chicago Cubs fan, a divisional rival of the Brewers, and anti-Semitie. In July 2013, Ryan Braun finally admitted to using performance-enhancing drugs and apologized to Laurenzi. Nevertheless, he was suspended for the remainder of the 2013 season. After admitting PED use in 2013, Braun never placed in the top-20 in MVP voting again and made just one All-Star game in the last eight years of his career.

Game 6 was Prince Fielder's last game as a Brewer, as he signed a free agent contract with the Detroit Tigers in the off-season. Despite just seven seasons in Milwaukee, Fielder still ranks in the top 5 in most all-time offensive categories. To date, his 50 homerun season in 2007 is still the most in Brewers franchise history for a single-season.

This was the start of four straight National League Championship Series appearances for the Cardinals, with 2011 being the only year they won the World Series.

References

External links
2011 NLCS at Baseball-Reference

National League Championship Series
National League Championship Series
Milwaukee Brewers postseason
St. Louis Cardinals postseason
National League Championship Series
National League Championship Series
2010s in Milwaukee
2010s in St. Louis
October 2011 sports events in the United States